Parliamentary elections were held in Austria on 1 March 1970. The result was a victory for the Socialist Party, which won 81 of the 165 seats to become the largest party for the first time in the Second Republic. With the SPÖ two seats short of a majority, SPÖ leader Bruno Kreisky became Chancellor at the head of a minority government that was tolerated by the Freedom Party of Austria in return for electoral reforms that benefitted smaller parties by increasing the proportionality of votes and seats. Voter turnout was 91.8%. It was the first Socialist-led government since 1920, and the first purely left-wing government in Austrian history. The SPÖ would lead the government for the next 29 years.

Early elections under the new system were held the following year, at which the Socialists won an outright majority.

Results

References

Elections in Austria
Austria
Legislative
Austria